Kyu-Won Han is a Korean-American baritone who has had an active international opera career for the last two decades.

Life and career
Kyu-Won Han was born in Seoul, South Korea in 1972.
After receiving his Bachelor and Master of Music degrees from the Manhattan School of Music, Han made his debut in 1999 as Masetto in Don Giovanni at the San Francisco Opera. An alumnus of its prestigious Adler Fellowship Program and the Merola Opera Program, he also featured in Turandot, Carmen and Madame Butterfly among others. In 2001 Han made his European debut as Ping in the Opera National du Rhin production of "Turandot"; he appeared as Papageno in Die Zauberflote with the New National Theater of Tokyo. His recent performances include the role of Figaro in the Opera National de Bordeaux production of Barber of Seville and double roles as Yamadori and Sharpless in "Madame Butterfly" at the Hyogo Performing Arts Center. Han is also active on the concert stage, and his credits include Beethoven's Ninth Symphony, Handel's Messiah, and Mahler's Eighth Symphony, Mendelssohn's "Elijah", "Carmina Burana" among numerous others. He is the recipient of many awards that include the Belvedere Competition, the Oratorio Society Competition, the Licia Albanese/ Puccini Competition, and the Di Capo Opera Competition to name a few. Han also released his debut CD, "Questo Amor", from Avex Classics.
He also sings "Nim Ui No Rae", main theme from the  Korean TV Drama King Sejong the Great.

Operatic roles

Morales in Carmen 
Frank in Die Fledermaus 
Don Giovanni, Masetto in Don Giovanni 
Prince Yamadori, Sharpless in Madame Butterfly
Maak in Mae Naak 
King of Kashii in The Silent Prince 
Scarpia in Tosca 
Ping in Turandot 
Papageno in Die Zauberflöte

Concerts

Beethoven's  Ninth Symphony
Beethoven's  Missa Solemnis 
Brahms's Requiem 
Faure's Requiem 
Handel's Messiah 
Mahler's Eighth Symphony 
Mozart's Coronation Mass 
Schubert's Mass No.2 
Berstein's Chichester Psalms 
Saint-Saëns's Oratorio de Noel 
Mendelssohn's Elijah 
Orff's Carmina Burana

References

Mae Naak: Review by Ken Smith in Opera Magazine, January 2006
 http://www.thestage.co.uk/reviews/review.php/33561/mae-naak

External links
 Artist's profile on Avex Classics
 DVD with Jung Won Park Soprano

American operatic baritones
Living people
1972 births
South Korean emigrants to the United States
21st-century American singers
21st-century American male singers